WIA may refer to:

 Wounded in action
 Windows Image Acquisition, an image scanner API
 Wireless Institute of Australia, The Wireless Institute of Australia, an amateur radio society
 Workforce Investment Act of 1998, a US Federal Law
 Wellington International Airport, New Zealand
 Wattay International Airport, Laos
 War in Afghanistan
 Wentzville Ice Arena
 Women in Animation

See also
 WEA (disambiguation)